Reza Habibzadeh (born April 13, 1996 in Tehran, Iran) is an Iranian football midfielder who currently plays for Paykan   in the Persian Gulf Pro League.

Club career

Club career statistics

References

1996 births
Living people
Iranian footballers
Association football midfielders
Naft Tehran F.C. players
Zob Ahan Esfahan F.C. players
Sportspeople from Tehran